McNulty Reservoir Dam in Eagle County, Colorado, United States, sits  above sea level in Colorado's Rocky Mountains between Rifle, Colorado and Vail, Colorado and  outside El Jebel, Colorado. The Dam is a water storage that used to be utilized for ranching purposes on the historic Mcnulty Ranch.

The reservoir and dam are named for Eagle County, Colorado's McNulty family of cattle ranchers. The McNulty family members have been Eagle County, Colorado settlers from the 1880s and cattle ranchers there from the 1920s. A portion of their McNulty Ranch, a one time  operation on the Eagle-Garfield County line, was sold for Open Space conservation to Eagle county in 2006 for approximately $2 million.
It is closed to any public access, fishing, or recreation.

References

External links
 Zoomable Satellite View of Reservoir and Dam
 Eagle County, Colorado official website
 Town of Eagle, Colorado official website
Fishing Works
MBendi Info
 McNulty ranch purchased, Post Independent 2006
 Eagle County, McNulty Open Space Summary

Dams in Colorado